Essex Township is one of seventeen townships in Kankakee County, Illinois, USA.  As of the 2010 census, its population was 1,480 and it contained 686 housing units.

History
The now lost towns of Tracy, Oklahoma, and Clarke City, which housed coal miners in the 1800s, were located in Essex Township.

Geography

Cities, towns, villages
 Essex

Adjacent townships
 Reed Township, Will County (north)
 Custer Township, Will County (northeast)
 Salina Township (east)
 Pilot Township (southeast)
 Norton Township (south)
 Greenfield Township, Grundy County (west)
 Braceville Township, Grundy County (northwest)

Cemeteries
The township contains these two cemeteries: North Essex and South Essex.

Major highways
  Illinois Route 17

Airports and landing strips
 Lagrange Airport
 Rashs Acres Airport

Demographics

Government
The township is governed by an elected Town Board of a Supervisor and four Trustees.  The Township also has an elected Assessor, Clerk, Highway Commissioner and Supervisor.  The Township Office is located at  315 North Pine, Essex, IL 60935.

Political districts
 Illinois's 11th congressional district
 State House District 75
 State Senate District 38

School districts
 Herscher Community Unit School District 2
 Reed Custer Community Unit School District 255U

References
 
 United States Census Bureau 2007 TIGER/Line Shapefiles
 United States National Atlas

External links
 Kankakee County Official Site
 City-Data.com
 Illinois State Archives

Townships in Kankakee County, Illinois
1855 establishments in Illinois
Townships in Illinois